Mario Gamero (6 June 1902 – 20 June 1983) was an Italian painter. His work was part of the painting event in the art competition at the 1936 Summer Olympics.

References

1902 births
1983 deaths
20th-century Italian painters
Italian male painters
Olympic competitors in art competitions
Painters from Turin
20th-century Italian male artists